Ketaki Prasad Dutta was an Indian politician belonging to Indian National Congress. He was elected as MLA of Karimganj North Vidhan Sabha Constituency in Assam Legislative Assembly in 1983. He died on 8 May 2019 at the age of 74. He was also the President of District Sports Association, Karimganj.

References

2019 deaths
Indian National Congress politicians
Bengali politicians
Assam MLAs 1983–1985
1944 births
Year of birth uncertain
People from Karimganj district
21st-century Bengalis
20th-century Bengalis
Indian National Congress politicians from Assam